Collingridge is an English surname. Notable people with the same surname are:

Arthur Collingridge (1853–1907), Australian painter, brother of George Collingridge.
Peter Collingridge (1757–1829), English Roman Catholic bishop.
George Collingridge (1847–1931), Australian writer.
Gordon Collingridge (active 1922–1928), Australian actor.
Graham Collingridge (born 1955), British neuroscientist. 
Vanessa Collingridge (born 1968), English author and broadcaster.